Nomakhosazana Meth is a South African politician who has been the Eastern Cape MEC (Member of the Executive Council) for Health since March 2021 and a Member of the Eastern Cape Provincial Legislature since May 2019. She was the MEC for Rural Development and Agrarian Reform from May 2019 to March 2021. Meth is a member of the African National Congress. She was previously both the speaker and mayor of the OR Tambo District Municipality and the speaker of the Mbizana Local Municipality.

Early life and education
Meth was born in Ntabankulu. Her birthday is December 20. She obtained certificates in local government law from both the University of Fort Hare and the University of Zululand. She obtained a junior degree in executive leadership and municipal development from the University of Pretoria. Meth is currently studying for an honours degree in public administration from Fort Hare.

Political career
Meth is a long-standing member of the African National Congress. She served as the speaker of the Mbizana Local Municipality from 2006 to 2008. After the 2011 municipal election, she was elected speaker of the OR Tambo District Municipality. She was elected mayor of the district municipality after the 2016 municipal election. She served as the chairperson of the ANCWL in the OR Tambo region from 2008 to 2014.

Meth was placed 4th on the ANC's provincial list for the provincial election of 8 May 2019. She was elected to the Eastern Cape Provincial Legislature as the ANC won 44 seats. She was sworn in as an MPL on 22 May 2019. On 28 May, newly elected provincial premier Oscar Mabuyane appointed her  Member of the Executive Council for Rural Development and Agrarian Reform. Meth took office the next day.

On 9 March 2021, Meth was appointed MEC for Health, replacing Sindiswa Gomba, who was dismissed as a MEC in February. Nonkqubela Pieters took over as the Rural Development and Agrarian Reform MEC.

Personal life
On 5 January 2019, Meth's two sons died in a car accident in Mthatha. She tested positive for COVID-19 in July 2020.

References

External links
Nomakhosazana Meth, Ms

Living people
Year of birth missing (living people)
Xhosa people
People from the Eastern Cape
African National Congress politicians
Members of the Eastern Cape Provincial Legislature
21st-century South African politicians
21st-century South African women politicians
Women members of provincial legislatures of South Africa